Paxton High School can refer to:

Paxton High School (Florida) in Paxton, Florida
Paxton High School (Nebraska) in Paxton, Nebraska